Isonville is an unincorporated community in Elliott County, Kentucky, United States.  It lies along Routes 32 and 486 east of the city of Sandy Hook, the county seat of Elliott County.  Its elevation is 709 feet (216 m).  It has a post office with the ZIP code 41149.

A post office was established in the community in 1866 and named for Archibald Ison, an early settler from Virginia.

References

Unincorporated communities in Elliott County, Kentucky
Unincorporated communities in Kentucky